Moel yr Henfaes, also listed by the Nuttall's as Pen Bwlch Llandrillo Top and sometimes known as Moel yr Henfaes, is a mountain in North Wales and forms part of the Berwyn range.

To the south is the higher Berwyn summits, including Cadair Berwyn. To the north lies Moel Fferna. The summit crowns an area of deep heather moorland and is located on a small rocky outcrop, marked by a pile of stones.

References

Hewitts of Wales
Mountains and hills of Denbighshire
Mountains and hills of Wrexham County Borough
Nuttalls